Jenks Park is a city park of Central Falls, Rhode Island. The city's only large park, its development began in 1890 on land donated by Alvin Jenks. Its centerpiece is Cogswell Tower, designed by Pawtucket architect Albert H. Humes and built in 1904. It has been the symbol of the City of Central Falls since its construction. The tower is supported by a brick barrel vault resting atop the historic Dexter's Ledge, from which, during King Philip's War in 1676, Native American scouts saw the approach of Captain Michael Pierce, and a company of Plymouth soldiers from the heights. Pierce's forces were ambushed and nearly annihilated by the Native Americans in "Pierce's Fight" at a site along the Blackstone River on March 26, 1676, where Pierce Park now stands.

The park was listed on the National Register of Historic Places in 1979.

See also
National Register of Historic Places listings in Providence County, Rhode Island

References

Towers completed in 1890
Buildings and structures on the National Register of Historic Places in Rhode Island
Buildings and structures in Central Falls, Rhode Island
Towers in Rhode Island
Parks in Rhode Island
Historic districts on the National Register of Historic Places in Rhode Island
National Register of Historic Places in Providence County, Rhode Island
1890 establishments in Rhode Island
Parks on the National Register of Historic Places in Rhode Island